Ram Badan is an Indian politician. He was elected to the Lok Sabha, the lower house of the Parliament of India from the Lalganj constituency of Uttar Pradesh as a member of the Janata Dal.

References

External links
Official biographical sketch in Parliament of India website

1943 births
Living people
Janata Dal politicians
Lok Sabha members from Uttar Pradesh
India MPs 1991–1996